Prostemma is a genus of bugs in the family Nabidae, subfamily Prostemmatinae and tribe Prostemmatini.

Species 
The following species are included:
 Prostemma aeneicolle Stein, 1857
 Prostemma albimacula Stein, 1857
 Prostemma antipodes Kerzhner, 1990
 Prostemma australicum Kerzhner & Strommer, 1990
 Prostemma bicolor Rambur, 1839
 Prostemma carduelis Dohrn, 1858
 Prostemma concinnum Walker, 1873
 Prostemma fasciatum (Stal, 1873)
 Prostemma guttula (Fabricius, 1787)
 Prostemma hilgendorfii Stein, 1878
 Prostemma kiborti Jakovlev, 1889
 Prostemma oeningensis Heer, 1853
 Prostemma reuteri Kerzhner, 1990
 Prostemma sanguineum (Rossi, 1790)
 Prostemma walkeri Kerzhner & Strommer, 1990

Note: Prostemma pallidiceps Stål, 1860 is a synonym of Pagasa pallidiceps (Stål, 1860)

References

External links
 
 

Heteroptera genera
Nabidae